Norvinisterone, sold under the brand names Neoprogestin and Nor-Progestelea, is a progestin and androgen/anabolic steroid (AAS) medication which was used in Europe but is now no longer marketed. It is taken by mouth.

Norvinisterone is a progestin, or a synthetic progestogen, and hence is an agonist of the progesterone receptor, the biological target of progestogens like progesterone. It has androgenic activity.

Norvinisterone was synthesized in 1953. It is no longer available.

Medical uses
Norvinisterone was used in hormonal contraception to prevent pregnancy.

Pharmacology

Pharmacodynamics
Norvinisterone is a progestogen. It appears to be quite androgenic, with about one-third and one-fifth of the androgenic and anabolic activity, respectively, of nandrolone in animal bioassays. However, it has also been reported to have little anabolic activity.

Chemistry

Norvinisterone, also known as 17α-vinyl-19-nortestosterone or as 17α-vinylestr-4-en-17β-ol-3-one, is a synthetic estrane steroid and a derivative of testosterone and 19-nortestosterone. Analogues of norvinisterone include the progestin norgesterone and the AAS vinyltestosterone.

History
Norvinisterone was synthesized in 1953 and was studied in humans by 1960.

Society and culture

Generic names
Norvinisterone is the generic name of the drug and its . It is also known as vinylnortestosterone and is known by its developmental code name SC-4641.

Brand names
Norvinisterone was marketed under the brand names Neoprogestin and Nor-Progestelea by Syntex.

Availability
Norgesterone is no longer marketed and hence is no longer available in any country.

References

Androgens and anabolic steroids
Estranes
Hepatotoxins
Hormonal contraception
Progestogens
Vinyl compounds